Kate Clinton (born November 9, 1947) is an American comedian specializing in political commentary from a gay/lesbian point of view.

Early life and education
Clinton was born in Buffalo, New York. She was raised in a large Catholic family in the state of New York. She attended Le Moyne College, a small Jesuit liberal arts college in Syracuse, New York and received her master's degree from Colgate University in the Village of Hamilton. Clinton went on to teach high school English for eight years before becoming a comedian.

Career 

She began her stand-up career in 1981 using her lesbianism, Catholicism and current politics for her jokes. Clinton is a self-described "fumerist," or feminist humorist.

In addition to comedy appearances and one-woman-shows such as Lady Ha Ha, Climate Change, Correct Me If I'm Right, All Het Up and Kate´s Out Is In, she has written three books,  Don't Get Me Started;  What the L and I Told You So. She performed at the inaugural We're Funny That Way! comedy festival in 1997, and appeared in the festival's documentary film in 1998.

Clinton has eight CDs including Climate Change and has two DVDs available.

She is a regular columnist for the national monthly magazine The Progressive and has been a past columnist for the national gay news magazine The Advocate. Her blogs can be found on The Huffington Post. She has made numerous appearances on television, and has served as grand marshal of gay pride parades.. When the U.S. invasion of Afghanistan began, she was a part-time commentator on CNN.

Clinton performed on Cyndi Lauper's True Colors Tour 2008. Also in 2008, she went on her "Hilarity Clinton" one person show tour.

Clinton is a regular emcee at the Out & Equal Workplace Awards Dinner and performed at the 2010 Workplace Awards Dinner in Los Angeles.

Personal life
Clinton lived in New York City and Provincetown, Massachusetts, with her partner Urvashi Vaid from 1988 until Vaid's death in 2022. Vaid was Executive Director of the National Gay and Lesbian Task Force (1988–92) and subsequently worked as an activist and writer.

Clinton's 2006 tour marked her 25th anniversary as a professional stand-up comedian. Clinton works extensively with social justice and nonprofit organizations and has been a regular emcee at major fundraising events and dinners for groups like the NYC LGBT Center (at its Annual Garden Party), the National Center for Lesbian Rights, the ACLU, and  Out & Equal, among others.

References

External links

Official Site 

1947 births
Living people
20th-century American comedians
21st-century American comedians
American feminists
American lesbian actresses
American women comedians
American women non-fiction writers
American lesbian artists
Lesbian feminists
LGBT Christians
Lesbian comedians
American women columnists
LGBT people from New York (state)
HuffPost writers and columnists
Colgate University alumni
Le Moyne College alumni
21st-century American actresses
American LGBT comedians